The Prairie Bluff Chalk is a geologic formation in Alabama and Mississippi. It preserves fossils dating back to the Cretaceous period.

The chalk was formed by marine sediments deposited along the eastern edge of the Mississippi embayment during the Maastrichtian stage of the Late Cretaceous.  It is a unit of the Selma Group and marks the end of the Cretaceous in Alabama.  Evidence has been found within the formation at Braggs, Moscow, and Millers Ferry in Alabama indicating an instantaneous to brief erosional event, most likely a tsunami, at the Cretaceous–Paleogene boundary (K–T boundary). It is hypothesized that this event, along with faulting and liquification of the Prairie Bluff Chalk, is related to the meteorite impact at the Chicxulub crater site, directly south, across the Gulf of Mexico, from the formation.

See also

List of fossil sites
List of fossiliferous stratigraphic units in Alabama
List of fossiliferous stratigraphic units in Mississippi
 Paleontology in Alabama
 Paleontology in Mississippi

References

External links
Microfossils: Images of Foraminifera from the Prairie Bluff FM at Starkville, MS from www.foraminifera.eu

Cretaceous Alabama
Cretaceous Mississippi
Geologic formations of Alabama
Chalk
Mississippi embayment
Maastrichtian Stage of North America